Come a Little Closer is the eleventh studio album by Etta James, released in 1974 on the Chess label. The album reached a peak position of number 47 on Billboard R&B Albums chart.

Reception
AllMusic stated: "Etta James was fighting serious substance-abuse problems when this album was recorded, commuting to the sessions from a rehab center. It was a triumph simply to complete the record at all. But although James' life may have been in rough shape outside of the studio, she delivered a fairly strong set that fused forceful '70s soul arrangements with some rock, jazz, and New Orleans R&B."

Track listing

Personnel
Etta James - vocals
Gabriel Mekler, Larry Nash - keyboards
Danny Kortchmar, Ken Marco, Lowell George, Wah Wah Watson - guitar
Larry Mizell - synthesizer
Bobby Keys, Charles Dinwiddie, David Allan Duke, Gene Cipriano, Jim Horn, Lew McCreary, Steve Madaio, Trevor Lawrence - horn section
Chuck Rainey - electric bass
Ken 'Spider' Rice - drums
Gary Coleman - percussion
Carlena Williams, Gwen Edwards, Venetta Fields - backing vocals
Trevor Lawrence - arrangement

References

1974 albums
Etta James albums
Albums produced by Gabriel Mekler
Chess Records albums